Serine protease hepsin is an enzyme that in humans is encoded by the HPN gene.

Function 

Hepsin is a cell surface serine protease.

Hepson contains a peptidase S1 domain and an SRCR domain. The SRCR domain is located in the extracellular part of the protein, it is formed primarily by three elements of regular secondary structure: a 12-residue alpha helix, a twisted five-stranded antiparallel beta sheet, and a second, two-stranded, antiparallel sheet. The two beta-sheets lie at roughly right angles to each other, with the helix nestled between the two, adopting an SRCR fold. The exact function of this domain has not been identified, though it probably may serve to orient the protease domain or place it in the vicinity of its substrate.

Clinical significance 

Hepsin expression is unregulated in prostate cancer and correlates with disease progression.

References

Further reading 

 
 
 
 
 
 
 
 
 
 

Protein domains